Monifieth railway station serves the town of Monifieth near Dundee, Scotland. It is sited  from the former Dundee East station, on the Dundee to Aberdeen line, between Balmossie and Barry Links. ScotRail, who manage the station, operate all services.

History
The station was opened on 6 October 1838 on the 5ft 6in gauge (1676mm) Dundee and Arbroath Railway. The station had two platforms either side of a double track running line. The goods yard was to the north of the station. The railway changed to standard gauge in 1847.

A camping coach was positioned here by the Scottish Region from 1956 to 1966, with two coaches here for the last two years.

The original station buildings have been demolished and recovered parts used for the Birkhill railway station building on the Bo'ness and Kinneil Railway.

Facilities 
Both platforms have shelters and benches. Platform 1 has a payphone and help point, whilst platform 2 is equipped with cycle racks. Both platforms have step-free access, but the footbridge which links them is not step-free. As there are no facilities to purchase tickets, passengers must buy one in advance, or from the guard on the train.

Passenger volume 

The statistics cover twelve month periods that start in April.

Services 
British Rail operated a local passenger service to the intermediate stations between Dundee and Arbroath until May 1990. Since these were discontinued, most of the intermediate stations have had only a very sparse service, provided so as to avoid the difficulty of formal closure procedures. In 2012, however, the number of services calling here increased from 2 per day to 6 per day from the December timetable change, unlike the other stations in the area (particularly Balmossie, Barry Links and Golf Street).

In the May 2022 timetable, there is an approximately hourly service in each direction to Dundee and Arbroath. There is no Sunday service.

In 2022, a number of people campaigned for the service - which currently terminates at Dundee - to be extended to Edinburgh, to avoid missing onward connections at Dundee.

References

Bibliography

External links

 RAILSCOT History of Station

Railway stations in Angus, Scotland
Former Dundee and Arbroath Railway stations
Railway stations in Great Britain opened in 1838
Railway stations served by ScotRail
1838 establishments in Scotland